The Moreland Motor Truck Company of Burbank, California, was originally located in Los Angeles. The Moreland trucks were sold worldwide.

History

In 1917 Watt L. Moreland was planning to move his business to Alhambra, California. When Burbank city officials heard about this news they offered Moreland  of land free of cost, located on the corner of San Fernando Blvd. and Alameda Ave. The city of Burbank raised $25,000 to pay for the land, buildings were constructed and the truck company moved in. The factory was still surrounded by acres of farms.

At the opening of the new factory in 1920 Watt Moreland wrote:

"As I look back to the little old shack where the first Morelands were built, all the way it has been a story of co-operation and I want with all the strength and emphasis possible express my appreciation and thanks to all those who, by their encouragement, their faithful work and interest,  have helped to put this organisation where it now stands."

Moreland had branches in Los Angeles, San Diego, Bakersfield, Stockland, Oakland, Portland, Santa Ana, Fresno, El Centro, Sacramento, San Francisco, Spokane and Salt Lake City.

The company slogan was "Built in the West -- for Western Work".

Due to wartime shortages the plant had to close in 1940. The Moreland buildings were later used by the Vega Aircraft Corporation.

References

External links 
 Moreland Truck ads on hankstruckpictures.com

Defunct truck manufacturers of the United States
Motor vehicle manufacturers based in California
Defunct motor vehicle manufacturers of the United States
Companies based in Burbank, California
History of the San Fernando Valley
Vehicle manufacturing companies established in 1920
Vehicle manufacturing companies disestablished in 1940
1920 establishments in California
1940 disestablishments in California
Defunct manufacturing companies based in Greater Los Angeles